The Congregation of the Sons of the Most Holy Redeemer (FSSR), commonly known as the Transalpine Redemptorists or The Sons, are a religious institute of the Catholic Church canonically erected in the Roman Catholic Diocese of Aberdeen and based on Papa Stronsay in the Orkney Islands, Scotland, as well as in the city of Christchurch, New Zealand. They were formed in 1988 as a traditionalist offshoot of the Redemptorists, following a monastic rule based on that of Alphonsus Liguori, and was later formally erected as a religious institute in 2012.

History
The congregation was founded as the Transalpine Congregation of the Most Holy Redeemer (CSSR) on 2 August 1988 by the Redemptorist priest Michael Mary Sim as a traditionalist Redemptorist religious community affiliated with the Society of Saint Pius X, and were called the Transalpine Redemptorists. 

Originally based at the Monastery of the Sorrowful and Immaculate Heart of Mary on the Isle of Sheppey, Kent, they moved to the Mother of Perpetual Succour Monastery in Joinville, Haute-Marne, France, in 1994, until they bought the island of Papa Stronsay on 31 May 1999. There they established the Golgotha Monastery, and have published The Catholic monthly since 1982. They promote a Redemptorist Purgatorian Confraternity. In July 2007 the institute established a second monastery in Christchurch, New Zealand.

In June 2008, the community petitioned the Holy See for reconciliation and this was accepted by Pope Benedict XVI who declared them to be in "canonical good standing" within the Catholic Church. The motu proprio Summorum Pontificum was the main incentive which caused the community to reconsider their position. Most of the members accepted the move, while a remnant continue to be affiliated with the SSPX. They changed their official name to The Sons of the Most Holy Redeemer (FSSR), and made alterations to their religious habit in order to more clearly differentiate themselves from that of the Redemptorists. However, they were not canonically established as a religious institute and thus their faculties for celebrating Mass were for some years restricted to the islands of Papa Stronsay and Stronsay.

On 15 August 2012, the community of fifteen was granted canonical recognition as a clerical institute of diocesan right by Hugh Gilbert, Bishop of Aberdeen. In June 2013, the congregation celebrated the ordination in Rome of two of its members.  During 2017 another small community was established at Kakahu by the Christchurch monastery.

On 7 October 2020, the community was invited to establish a monastery in the Diocese of Great Falls–Billings, Montana, US.

See also
 Catholic Church in Scotland
 List of monastic houses in Scotland

References

External links 
 Golgotha Monastery, Papa Stronsay, Orkney Scotland (official website)
 Transalpine Redemptorists at home (official blog)
 Friends of Papa Stronsay

Traditionalist Catholicism
Christian religious orders established in the 20th century
Communities using the Tridentine Mass
Ecclesia Dei
Organisations based in Orkney
Orkney
Religion in Orkney
Catholic Church in Scotland
Catholic orders and societies
Society of Saint Pius X